Kopfing im Innkreis is a municipality in the district of Schärding in the Austrian state of Upper Austria.

Geography
Kopfing lies in the northern Innviertel. About 46 percent of the municipality is forest, and 48 percent is farmland.

References

Sauwald
Cities and towns in Schärding District